In Search of Sunrise 11: Las Vegas is a compilation album by Dutch trance producer Richard Durand in collaboration with Hungarian duo Myon & Shane 54. It was released on June 3, 2013 by SongBird. It is the eleventh installment in the In Search of Sunrise compilation series.

Track listing

References

External links 
 In Search of Sunrise 11: Las Vegas at Black Hole Official Online Store

Electronic compilation albums
2013 compilation albums